is a Japanese politician of the Liberal Democratic Party (LDP), a member of the House of Representatives in the Diet (national legislature) and Minister of State for Okinawa and Northern Territories Affairs. A native of Kurobe, Toyama and dropout of Kyoto University, he was elected to the first of his four terms in the assembly of Toyama Prefecture in 1983 and then to the House of Representatives for the first time in 1998.

Miyakoshi likes Awamori, an alcoholic beverage in Okinawa, very much.

References 
 
https://japantoday.com/category/politics/update1-japan-lawmaker-drank-with-30-people-despite-virus-warnings

External links 
 Official website in Japanese.

1950 births
Living people
People from Toyama Prefecture
Kyoto University alumni
Members of the House of Representatives (Japan)
Liberal Democratic Party (Japan) politicians
21st-century Japanese politicians